Frank Rohde (born 2 March 1960 in Rostock) is a German former football player and coach.

Frank Rohde learned to play football at SG Dynamo Rostock-Mitte, like his three older brothers Peter, Rainer and Jürgen. Their father Egon Rodhe was a youth trainer at SG Dynamo Rostock-Mitte. Egon Rohde was delegated to BFC Dynamo in 1969. He became the head of the youth department and expanded the youth department of BFC Dynamo into a talent factory. Their father brought his four sons with him to East Berlin and Frank Rohde joined the youth department of BFC Dynamo. He then followed his three brothers to the elite Children and Youth Sports School (KJS) "Werner Seelenbinder" in Alt-Hohenschönhausen. All of his brothers played for BFC Dynamo.

Frank Rohde made his professional debut for BFC Dynamo in the 1979–80 season. He won nine East German league and two East Germany cups titles with BFC Dynamo. He was transferred to Hamburger SV together with Thomas Doll in 1990. Rohde played a total of 303 top-flight matches in East Germany and reunified Germany. He later joined Hertha BSC in 1993. Hertha BSC played in the 2. Bundesliga at the time.

Rohde has acknowledged that he learned a lot at Hamburger SV and Hertha BSC, but claims that his years at BFC Dynamo were his best. The sweeper won 42 caps for East Germany in the 1980s.

Miscellaneous
Rohde lives in Eisenhüttenstadt and works as a teacher as of 2020.

Honours
 East German Champion
 Winner: (9) 1979–80, 1980–81, 1981–82, 1982–83, 1983–84, 1984–85, 1985–86, 1986–87, 1987–88
 FDGB-Pokal
 Winners: 1987–88, 1988–89

References

External links
 
 
 

1960 births
Living people
Sportspeople from Rostock
People from Bezirk Rostock
German footballers
East German footballers
Footballers from Mecklenburg-Western Pomerania
East Germany international footballers
German football managers
Berliner FC Dynamo players
Hamburger SV players
Hertha BSC players
Bundesliga players
2. Bundesliga players
Chemnitzer FC managers
DDR-Oberliga players
Association football defenders